Stewart's Department Store, also known as the Posner Building, is a historic department store building located on Howard Street at Baltimore, Maryland, United States. Catholic Relief Services is currently headquartered there.

Architecture
The Stewart's Department Store structure was designed in 1899 by Charles E. Cassell and is a six-story brick and terra cotta steel-framed building detailed in a highly ornate Italian Renaissance Revival style. It features an exuberant ornamental detail includes fluted Ionic and Corinthian columns, lion heads, caryatids, wreaths, garlands, cartouches, and an elaborate bracketed cornice.

The Stewart's Department Store Building was listed on the National Register of Historic Places in 1999. The downtown flagship store was closed in 1978.

History

Stewart's began in 1901 when Louis Stewart acquired the building of Posner's Department Store on the northeast corner of Howard and Lexington Streets. The chain was a founding member of Associated Dry Goods or ADG. 

Stewart's opened its first suburban store in 1953. The  store on York Road was located near the city/county line. Built on two levels and surrounded by parking, the store was designed to “blend into the suburban area around it.” The design included broad expanses of glass from floor to ceiling, “screened by Fiberglas curtains containing 600 square yards of materials.” Elaborate murals of Homewood House, the Washington Monument and the Federal Hill skyline decorated walls in the store, and a restaurant with a Chesapeake Bay theme became a destination for northern shoppers.

Four other stores followed in the 1960s and 1970s.  They included Reisterstown Road Plaza in 1962, Timonium Mall in 1969, Westview Shopping Center (an addition to a 1958 Mall) in 1969, and the store's final branch at Golden Ring Mall in Rosedale, Maryland, in 1974.

Suburban stores were converted to ADG's Caldor discount chain in 1983.

References

External links

, including photo from 1998, at Maryland Historical Trust
 Stewart's – Explore Baltimore Heritage
 "Downtown Department Stores, and other Retail Goodies"  Baltimore
 "Photo of Reisterstown Road store interior
 Photo of Resisterstown Road store exterior
 "Camellia Room" at Stewart & Co. Reisterstown Road
 "Chesapeake Room" restaurant at Stewart & Co. Reisterstown Road Plaza
 Article about department stores in Baltimore

Buildings and structures in Baltimore
Commercial buildings on the National Register of Historic Places in Baltimore
Commercial buildings completed in 1899
Downtown Baltimore
Renaissance Revival architecture in Maryland
Italian Renaissance Revival architecture in the United States
Department stores on the National Register of Historic Places
1899 establishments in Maryland
Retail companies established in 1901
Defunct department stores based in Maryland
Retail companies disestablished in 1983
Defunct companies based in Baltimore